Onceropyga pulchra is a species of moth in the family Zygaenidae. It is found in Australia in south-eastern Queensland and eastern New South Wales.

The length of the forewings is 6.5 mm for males and 8 mm for females. The upperside of the forewings is dark brown with a slightly lighter spot at the end of the cell, distally bordered by a suffusion of blackish scales. The underside is dark grey brown, but slightly lighter medially. The hindwings are blackish on both sides, but slightly lighter basally, with a light brown costal margin.

References

Moths described in 2005
Procridinae